"Let It Go" is a song performed by British singer Will Young. It was written by Eg White, Jeremy Gregory and Karen Poole and recorded for Young's fourth studio album Let It Go (2008). The song was released as the album's third single on 2 March 2009. It was Young's lowest-selling single at the time and his first to miss the Top 40 on the UK Singles Chart.

Music video
A music video for "Let It Go," directed by W.I.Z., premiered on video sharing website YouTube on 11 February 2009. It features Young dressed up in a superhero costume, being arrested by two police officers. It continues with Young wandering in town alone and dancing with a mannequin he stole from a shop as if emphasizing that he indeed has no friend.

Track listing

Credits and personnel

David Angell – violin
John Catchings – cello
David Davidson – arranger, violin
Richard Edgeler – mixing assistance
Jeremy Gregory – writer
Love Sponge Strings – strings

Karen Poole – writer
Bobby Shin – recording engineer
Jeremy Wheatley – mixing engineer
Eg White – instruments, producer, writer
Kristin Wilkinson – viola
Will Young – vocals

Charts

Release history

References

2009 singles
Will Young songs
Songs written by Eg White
Songs written by Karen Poole
2008 songs
Sony BMG singles